Macrostrombus is a genus of sea snails, marine gastropod mollusks in the family Strombidae, the true conchs.

Species
 † Macrostrombus bartoni Petuch & Drolshagen, 2011 
 † Macrostrombus brachior (Petuch, 1994) 
 † Macrostrombus briani Petuch & Drolshagen, 2011 
 † Macrostrombus collierensis Petuch & Drolshagen, 2011 
 Macrostrombus costatus (Gmelin, 1791)
 † Macrostrombus diegelae (Petuch, 1991) 
 † Macrostrombus dubari Petuch & Drolshagen, 2011 
 † Macrostrombus haitensis (G. B. Sowerby I, 1850) 
 † Macrostrombus hertweckorum (Petuch, 1991) 
 † Macrostrombus jonesorum (Petuch, 1994) 
 † Macrostrombus leidyi (Heilprin, 1887) 
 † Macrostrombus mayacensis (H. I. Tucker & D. Wilson, 1933) 
 † Macrostrombus mulepenensis (Petuch, 1994) 
 † Macrostrombus oleiniki Petuch & Drolshagen, 2011 
 † Macrostrombus pascaleae (Landau, Kronenberg & Silva, 2010) 
 † Macrostrombus sargenti Petuch & Drolshagen, 2011 
 † Macrostrombus tomeui Petuch & Drolshagen, 2011 
 † Macrostrombus whicheri Petuch & Drolshagen, 2011 
 † Macrostrombus williamsi (Olsson & Petit, 1964)

References

 Petuch E.J. (1994). Atlas of Florida fossil shells. Evanston, Illinois: Chicago Spectrum Press. 394 pp., 20 figs., 100 pls.
 Liverani V. (2014) The superfamily Stromboidea. Addenda and corrigenda. In: G.T. Poppe, K. Groh & C. Renker (eds), A conchological iconography. pp. 1-54, pls 131-164. Harxheim: Conchbooks.
 Maxwell S.J., Dekkers A.M., Rymer T.L. & Congdon B.C. (2020). Towards resolving the American and West African Strombidae (Mollusca: Gastropoda: Neostromboidae) using integrated taxonomy. The Festivus. 52(1): 3-38.

Strombidae
Gastropod genera